Lakewood High School is a public high school in Hebron, Ohio, United States. Their athletic teams are known as the Lancers.

State championships

 Boys Baseball – 1993, 1994, 2005
 Girls Softball - 2008, 2009, 2010, 2016,  2017

Notes and references

External links
 

High schools in Licking County, Ohio
Public high schools in Ohio